Jonathan is a comic, a story based on the Buffy the Vampire Slayer television series.

Story description

Only one person can save Sunnydale from Russian vampire mobsters, surprisingly that is Jonathan Levinson. Jonathan gets help from the Slayer and her pals. It seems Jonathan is quite the legend, and appears to be admired by the whole world. Jonathan's fame continues into the Buffy episode Superstar.

Continuity

Supposed to be set in Buffy season 4, after "This Year's Girl" but before "Superstar".

Canonical issues

Buffy comics such as this one are not usually considered by fans as canonical. Some fans consider them stories from the imaginations of authors and artists, while other fans consider them as taking place in an alternative fictional reality. However unlike fan fiction, overviews summarising their story, written early in the writing process, were 'approved' by both Fox and Joss Whedon (or his office), and the books were therefore later published as official Buffy merchandise.  Some fans argue this comic is canon, because it was written by Jane Espenson.

Ultimately, since the events of this comic are set in the world created by Jonathan in "Superstar", as such they would have been erased at the end of that episode.

External links
 Free ecomic of Jonathan from the BBC

Comics based on Buffy the Vampire Slayer
Prequel comics